Marc Bleuse (born 23 February 1937 in Niort) is a French musician, composer and conductor.

Biography 
Bleuse's mother was a piano player who performed a great deal of chamber music. Her being in the music industry motivated Bleuse to develop interest in music.

Bleuse started to study piano when he was six years old. In 1967 his music was first published.

He was a pupil of Simone Plé and André Jolivet at the Conservatoire de Paris. From the beginning of his career, this composer devoted himself essentially to pedagogy.

In January 1984 he was appointed director of the Conservatoire de Paris.

Bleuse has three children: Emmanuel (cellist), Pierre (conductor) and Jeanne (pianist).

Selection of works 
 Alternative for viola and piano (1974); Éditions Heugel
 Bairro Alto (Quartier Haut) for viola solo (1995); Éditions Gérard Billaudot
 El Contador for viola solo (1981); Éditions Gérard Billaudot

External links 
 Marc Bleuse : Oui à la décentralisation ! (La Lettre du musicien)
 Biography

1937 births
Living people
20th-century French composers
Conservatoire de Paris alumni
Directors of the Conservatoire de Paris
French composers
French music educators
People from Niort